Sonny Melendrez (born 1946) is an American radio and TV personality, motivational speaker and author.

Biography

Melendrez was born in Silver City, New Mexico.

Twice named Billboard Magazine's "Radio Personality of the Year", he is included in the Rock & Roll Hall of Fame as one of the Top 100 Radio Personalities of All Time. In 2004 he was inducted into the Texas Radio Hall of Fame.

In the late 1960's, Melendrez was a DJ at KINT A.M. in El Paso, Texas.  This was before the advent of KINT FM in the early 1970's.

In the 1970s, he guest hosted American Top 40 on several occasions and entertained on radio at KIIS, KMPC, KFI, KMGG and KRLA in Los Angeles.

He hosted the children's series You and Me Kid, on the Disney Channel in 1983-90.

In 1985, he returned to San Antonio, hosting morning drive radio shows on KTFM 1985-1997, KSMG 1997-2001, KLUP 2001-2003 and KAHL 2003-2005.

In 1997, the City of San Antonio named the Melendrez Community Center located on the city's West Side in  his honor for his support of Parks and Recreation youth programs.

In 2005 he became a motivational keynote speaker, delivering presentations nationally and worldwide.

According to Melendrez' own on-line "mini biography", Melendrez is the voice of several characters in the cartoon show The Jetsons; he created many of the sounds heard in the Gremlins movie; was the bug who yelled 'Oh, no! It's Raaaaaaid!' in the popular TV commercial; played opposite Walter Matthau as the voice of Bob Cratchet in the animated TV classic, The Stingiest Man in Town; and was even the voice of the infamous Fred the Cockatoo in the '70s ABC TV series, Baretta.

Notes

External links
SonnyMelendrez.com
.

1946 births
Living people
Male actors from San Antonio
American male television actors
American male voice actors
Central Catholic Marianist High School alumni
University of Texas at El Paso alumni